Kudratillo Xabibullo Ogli Abdukakhorov (born 29 August 1993) is an Uzbek professional boxer who held the WBC "Silver" welterweight title from 2017 to 2018.

Amateur career
Abduqaxorov's first amateur fight took place in 2004. He was a four-time national champion as an amateur but he never represented his country in international competition. He holds a 280-50 record as an amateur.

Professional career
Abdukakhorov made his professional debut on 18 October 2015. 

In March 2017, Abdukakhorov claimed the WBC "Silver" welterweight title against Charles Manyuchi.

Abdukakhorov vs Lipinets cancellation

Professional boxing record

References

1993 births
Living people
Uzbekistani male boxers
People from Andijan Region
Welterweight boxers